Marie Nicole Le Guay d'Oliva (Paris, September, 1761 – Fontenay-sous-Bois, 1789), was a French prostitute and memoirist. She is known in history as one of the participants of the famous fraud known as the Affair of the Diamond Necklace.

Life
She was born in Paris as the daughter of Claude Le Guay and Marguerite David. She was orphaned early in life, and was forced to rely on prostitution to support herself. She called herself 'Baroness d'Oliva', and prostituted herself in the gardens of the Palais Royal in Paris. 

In spring 1784, she was contacted by Nicholas de la Motte, spouse of Jeanne de Valois-Saint-Rémy. She was hired by them to pose as queen Marie Antoinette in a late-night meeting with a man in the garden of Versailles. During the meeting, she was to deliver a few words, a rose, and a letter. The meeting was a crucial part of the fraud Affair of the Diamond Necklace: the man was Cardinal de Rohan, and the intent was to convince him that the queen was indeed involved in the affair. She had been chosen to perform the part because of her likeness to the queen, and was to be dressed in a white dress similar to that of the queen. 

In summer 1785, the fraud was exposed in Paris. On 16 October 1785, Nicole d'Oliva was arrested in Brussels in the company of a man named Toussaint de Beausire. She was transferred to the Bastille, where she gave birth to a child. All of the accomplices were put on trial. 

Nicole d'Oliva stated in her trial that she had not been aware of the fraud. She had participated in the famous meeting, but she was not aware of the purpose of it. As far as she knew, she had simply been hired to play an acting role. The court believed in Nicole d'Oliva's statement, and she was the only person involved in the fraud who was freed in court besides Cardinal de Rohan. 

After the trial, she had an affair with her defense lawyer. She died four years after the trial, as a guest in the Fontenay-sous-Bois convent.

Memoirs
d'Olivia published her own memoirs after the trial: Mémoire pour la demoiselle le Guay d'Oliva, fille mineure, émancipée d'âge, accusée, contre M. le Procurer-général.

References

1761 births
1789 deaths
Affair of the Diamond Necklace
French prostitutes
18th-century French memoirists
Prisoners of the Bastille
French women memoirists